Westamerica Bancorporation is the holding company for Westamerica Bank and its subsidiaries. The commercial and regional community bank, headquartered in San Rafael, California, has $4.7 billion in assets and more than 90 branches in Northern and Central California.

History 
Westamerica Bancorporation is a northern California bank holding company comprising two principal subsidiaries: Westamerica Bank and Bank of Lake County, both community banks serving individuals and business clients. The holding company also oversees the operations of Community Banker Services Corporation and Westcore, which perform certain administrative functions. Westamerica Bancorporation operates more than 50 branches in 12 California counties including Marin, Napa, and Sonoma. From a handful of small community banks in the early 1970s operating under a bank holding company organization, Westamerica had expanded by the mid-1990s to a position as one of the largest networks of community banks serving northern California and as a market share leader in many of the local areas it served.

Formed in 1972 under the name of Independent Bankshares Corporation, the holding company consolidated three previously unaffiliated banks: Bank of Marin, Bank of Sonoma County, and First National Bank of Mendocino County, which was formerly known as First National Bank of Cloverdale. The new structure began operations in 1973.

The three individual banks which formed the 1972 holding company and many of the subsequent additions to the Westamerica network are invested with their own community banking history. Many of these individual banks trace their roots to banks which were formed by local business people to provide specialty financing for the local community business base. Many of these California businesses—often involved in agriculture—faced problems securing loans from big-city banks which had strong ties to the interests of their railroad customers.

The First National Bank of Mendocino County provided the holding company with its oldest bank charter dating to 1886. The Foster family of Marin County was one of the original families instrumental in founding the Mendocino bank which was formerly known as the First National Bank of Cloverdale. The bank was founded to provide financing for the people involved in agricultural interests in the Mendocino area where sheep ranching was a dominant industry. The Bank of Marin County was formed by businessmen involved in the dairy business and other local merchants.

The Bank of Sonoma County served the western portion of the county, where cattle ranchers and dairy farmers were the major economic players. The bank was a major financier for the area's apple growers who produced the red-and-yellow skin Gravenstein apples primarily used to make applesauce.

In the 1920s, prominent pear growers, including the Bucknell family, were involved in creating the Bank of Lake County, formerly called the Bank of Upper Lake. That bank expanded and branched as the local economy grew along the shores of Clear Lake.

Vaca Valley Bank's roots are linked to the Gibson family and its local business interests in newspapers and publishing in Solano County and the surrounding area. Westamerica Chairman David L. Payne's grandfather, Luther Gibson, was chairman of Vaca Valley Bank. Payne became involved in the newspaper and publishing side of the Gibson family business in the late 1970s and continued the family tradition in banking in the latter part of the 1980s.

Though their origins are more recent, other banks in the Westamerica network also trace their history to the growth in their local communities. Napa Valley Bank was founded upon the expanding wine and tourism industries in the area in the 1960s. CapitolBank in Sacramento County and Gold Country Bank in Nevada County were fueled by the influx of retirees when that area in the western foothills of the Sierra Nevada mountain range became an attractive relocation spot for older citizens in the 1970s.

During the 1970s, the parent company, Independent Bancshares Corporation, followed a conservative acquisition policy that entailed purchasing community banks in a county-by-county stepping-stone pattern. In 1974, the company acquired Bank of Lake County, a California state-chartered bank that operated in the county adjacent to where Westamerica's existing operations were located. Gold County Bank in 1979 and Vaca Valley Bank in 1981 were each purchased by exchanging shares of the company for the shares of the acquired banks.

These six banks were consolidated in mid-1983 into a single subsidiary bank, First National Bank of Mendocino County, which subsequently changed its name to Westamerica Bank. The company recorded below industry average earnings and investment return benchmarks during the remainder of the 1980s. The company's performance during this time was impacted by stiff competition from larger banks and other financial institutions such as brokerage firms, mutual funds and insurance firms as well as problem real estate loans. The company became a target for takeover in the late 1980s but successfully fought those moves and remained independent.

Fueled by a series of acquisitions, reorganizations, and mergers, the 1990s ushered in a period of earnings growth and enhanced investment performance. The company's asset base almost doubled in the period from the end of 1990 to mid-1995.

During the 1990s, the company operated in an economic environment marked by slow growth in the affluent markets it served and in a banking environment marked by consolidation among large banks at one end of the spectrum and community banks at the other end, where Westamerica positioned itself.

Within this environment, Westamerica pursued a two-pronged growth strategy by expanding existing bank operations and by acquiring other community banks. The company purchased the $60 million asset-based John Muir National Bank in 1992.

The following year, the company acquired Napa Valley Bancorp, a bank holding company with an asset base of $600 million and with banking operations in geographical markets in which Westamerica competed. The acquired bank holding company consisted of a number of subsidiaries: Napa Valley Bank, Suisun Valley Bank, an 88 percent interest in Bank of Lake County, and a 50 percent interest in Sonoma Valley Bank. Westamerica also gained additional back-office operations with the Napa Valley Bancorp Services subsidiary which provided data processing and other services to the network of acquired banks.

Over the next 12 months, Westamerica melded and reorganized Napa Valley's operations and assets. Suisun Valley was merged into Westamerica Bank, the name of Napa Valley Bancorp Services was changed to Community Banker Services Corporation and the 50 percent interest in Sonoma Valley Bank was sold and the proceeds were used to improve Westamerica's financial base. Through a series of financial transactions, the company consolidated its mortgage banking operations into Community Banker Services and purchased the remaining 12 percent interest in Bank of Lake County from outside investors.

The company next completed three significant acquisitions in 1995. In January, the company purchased the $170 million in assets held by PV Financial, which owned PV National Bank. CapitolBank Sacramento with its $139 million asset base was bought in June and North Bay Bancorp, the parent of $108 million Novato National Bank, was acquired the following month.

The bank also purchased two Bank of America branches and opened a new branch in Contra Costa County's Concord, "a market with strong demographics where no suitable acquisition opportunity was available," the company stated in its 1995 Annual Report. In April 1996, the Napa Valley Bank subsidiary was merged into the Westamerica subsidiary.

In a research report dated July 18, 1995, issued by the brokerage firm Dain Bosworth Inc, the author Thatcher S. Thompson attributed "the success of Westamerica's acquisition policy" to three factors: "disciplined pricing, cost control and high credit quality standards." Many Wall Street securities analysts credit David L. Payne for Westamerica's turnaround and successful strategy in the 1990s. Payne assumed the position of chairman in 1988 and of chief executive officer and president in 1989. Payne had been a director of the company since 1985 and his grandfather had been chairman of the Vaca Valley Bank.

In the 1990s, Westamerica's growth was marked by a renewed emphasis upon its roots in community banking. With many of the banks in its network tracing their lineage to local businesses, Westamerica has continued to emphasize serving the local small business community. The individual banks have attempted to retain their local identity and their local bank managers have been given the authority to tailor and price their products and services for the needs of the individual and small businesses in the local community. In an official filing with the Securities and Exchange Commission, Westamerica said its individual banks emphasized "big bank resources with small bank resourcefulness."

Westamerica's bankers have maintained strong personal contacts with local small business clients. Thompson's July 18, 1995 report for Dain Bosworth recognized Westamerica's local bankers as a "top-notch sales force."

"Westamerica's hard-driving bankers sell, sell, and then sell some more" was the headline of a November 29, 1994 article in The America Banker which described how the bank's staffers toted pagers, cellular phones, and laptop computers when they called upon their existing and potential local small business customers. The article noted that the meet-the-customer approach had helped Westamerica achieve a position as a super-community bank which could effectively compete with California banking giants such as First Interstate, Wells Fargo, and BankAmerica Corp.

The bank also has created niche products and services for its individual customers, particularly affluent professionals and people over the age of 50 years. Payne described his strategy as "working my niches and working them well" in an article in the April 17, 1995 issue of the Business Journal for Sacramento, California. "We aren't everything to everybody, and we don't try to be," Payne told the publication.

One niche product that Westamerica created was its "VIP Banking" service for the 20 percent of its customers who represent 80 percent of its profits. Another example of niche marketing was cited by a research report issued in June 1993 by the Minneapolis-based brokerage firm of Piper Jaffray and authored by Steven R. Schroll. That report noted that checking account packages for people 50 years and older provided Westamerica with a deposit base which was "much more stable, less expensive, and thus a much more desirable source of funding" than the average individual account at other banks.

Under Payne's leadership, Westamerica also strengthened its financial foundation. Although labeled as a "Rich Kid" in an October 4, 1991 article in The American Banker, the article's author Sam Zuckerman wrote that Payne had gained respect since becoming chairman in late 1988 for tackling the problem of troubled loans to the construction industry. Within 18 months, Zuckerman described Payne as one of the banking industry's "rising stars" and as "an up-and-coming banking executive" in a January 21, 1993 article in The American Banker.

The acquisitions of the 1990s engineered under Payne's stewardship received high marks from banking industry executives and observers. Westamerica avoided loan quality problems by focusing its acquisition targets among high-quality banks. Payne "hasn't been bottom-feeding, buying problem banks for a good price. He buys good banks," said banking competitor Harold Giomi, President of Sunrise Bank of California in Roseville, in the Business Journal article of April 17, 1995.

The acquired banks were quickly integrated into Westamerica's organization. A February 28, 1994 article in The American Banker described how a team approach "enabled Westamerica to consolidate in just 60 days" the operations of the acquired Napa Valley Bancorp. and noted that Westamerica retained 95 percent of Napa Valley's existing business.

Westamerica's "expense reduction campaign" and "strict cost control" were cited in the Dain Bosworth July 18, 1995 research report as major factors that contributed to the bank's improved earnings and return on investment in the 1990s. The ranks of personnel were kept to a minimum as evidenced by the less than one dozen employees working at the bank holding company's headquarters in the mid-1990s. While company assets significantly expanded, the total number of employees declined in the first half of the 1990s decade.

Branch efficiency and productivity were another area of cost control. Westamerica shut branches that did not meet profitability and growth benchmarks. Acquired and existing branches that overlapped were closed. Back-office operations throughout the system also were consolidated.

Westamerica's plans for the last half of the 1990 decade were addressed by Payne in the April 17, 1995 Business Journal article. Payne stated, "Our longer-term plan is to expand further in the Sacramento market," where, the article noted, economic growth is forecast to outpace the rate in the San Francisco bay area and the northern California coastal regions according to some demographic economists.

Payne provided a more detailed outline of Westamerica's future strategy in the 1995 Annual Report. Payne reported that Westamerica would pursue its growth-by-acquisition strategy but promised to "apply strict criteria" including a "profitability within six months" standard for each acquisition.

He described the evolving shape of community banking and the products and services the customers want and need: "They want to be able to bank from home 24 hours a day and have access to well-trained representatives, not prerecorded messages." To deliver round-the-clock service with "knowledgeable and responsive" employees, Payne noted that "technology is playing a larger role in this effort" so that employees can "answer customers' needs more quickly, whether to process a loan or deposit, or to simply fulfill a service need."

Befitting a network of community banks, many of which were spawned by local business people, Payne noted that Westamerica's bankers embrace the entrepreneurial bent of their customers and thus operate within "a sales and service culture that motivates and rewards performance." Westamerica's bankers receive compensation linked to their achievement of performance goals "from the number of outside calls each branch office must make each week, to how quickly our bankers must respond to customer requests," Payne stated in the 1995 Annual Report.

Payne noted that Westamerica would continue to adhere to stringent cost control by "further streamlining our back-office functions and reducing our cost structures."

Such a blueprint for further growth at Westamerica could be a double-edged sword. Thompson at Dain Bosworth noted that while Westamerica was well-positioned to continue its growth by acquisition and internal cost control, these strengths made Westamerica an attractive takeover candidate. Thompson forecast, "acquisition of this company is certainly a possibility; however, as long as earnings continue to grow and small bank opportunities remain abundant, we think it is more likely we will see Westamerica in the ranks of the consolidators as opposed to the consolidated."

Products and services 

Personal banking -  Westamerica is a community bank with a focus on transaction accounts and personal service.  The bank is one of the few that process credits before debits, meaning deposits are credited to accounts every business day before debits or withdrawals.

Business banking - Westamerica offers multiple checking, savings and money market account options for small businesses and corporations. The banks offers account analysis and merchant services options to its customers.

Branch locations 
The largest subsidiary in our holding company, Westamerica Bank is a regional community bank with over 80 offices and 2 trust offices in 21 counties throughout Northern and Central California.

Bank ratings 

Westamerica Bank was ranked third among all banks in the United States in 2008, up from sixth in 2007. This ranking was higher than any of the ten largest banks operating in the United States, including US Bank and Wells Fargo.  Westamerica was rated as "the best of the bunch" by USBanker in 2009 among mid-tier banks between two and 10 billion dollars in total assets. Westamerica Bank earned the highest credit rating of AAA from Fitch Ratings in 2008 and was classified as stable.

References

External links
Corporate Website

Companies based in Marin County, California
Banks based in California
Fairfield, California
Companies listed on the Nasdaq